Michael Spicer is a British comedy writer and performer. He is best known for his satirical video series The Room Next Door.

Career
In the Room Next Door videos, Spicer plays a frustrated adviser who is communicating live via an earpiece with a figure speaking in public. The videos cut between the exasperated Spicer and real footage of the public figure at a speaking engagement. Figures lampooned include Prince Andrew, Boris Johnson and Donald Trump. The Room Next Door has also been featured on The Late Late Show with James Corden in the United States.

Spicer is also an actor, appearing in the Netflix series Bridgerton and After Life, and the BBC 2 comedy series Mandy.  He also produced series 2 of Mandy. He has also appeared in the The Mash Report and Late Night Mash.

His radio series Michael Spicer: Before Next Door was broadcast on BBC Radio 4.

Awards 
Spicer won the internet category at the 2020 Chortle Awards and the 2020 Comedy.co.uk Award for Best Radio Sitcom, for the pilot of his BBC Radio 4 comedy Michael Spicer: Before Next Door. The first series of Michael Spicer: Before Next Door subsequently won the 2021 Comedy.co.uk Award for Best Radio Sitcom.

Publications
The Secret Political Adviser: The Unredacted Files of the Man in the Room Next Door. Canongate, 2020.

References

External links

Year of birth missing (living people)
Living people
British comedians